

Events

Pre-1600
 538 – Vitiges, king of the Ostrogoths ends his siege of Rome and retreats to Ravenna, leaving the city to the victorious Byzantine general, Belisarius.
1088 – Election of Urban II as the 159th Pope of the Catholic Church. He is best known for initiating the Crusades.
1158 – German city Munich (München) is first mentioned as forum apud Munichen in the Augsburg arbitration by Holy Roman Emperor Friedrich I.
1579 – Start of the Siege of Maastricht, part of the Eighty Years' War.

1601–1900
1622 – Ignatius of Loyola and Francis Xavier, founders of the Society of Jesus, are canonized by the Roman Catholic Church.
1689 – James II of England landed at Kinsale, starting the Williamite War in Ireland.
1811 – Peninsular War: A day after a successful rearguard action, French Marshal Michel Ney once again successfully delays the pursuing Anglo-Portuguese force at the Battle of Redinha.

1901–present
1912 – The Girl Guides (later renamed the Girl Scouts of the USA) are founded in the United States.
1913 – The future capital of Australia is officially named Canberra.
1918 – Moscow becomes the capital of Russia again after Saint Petersburg held this status for most of the period since 1713.
1920 – The Kapp Putsch begins when the Marinebrigade Ehrhardt is ordered to march on Berlin.
1928 – In California, the St. Francis Dam fails; the resulting floods kill 431 people.
1930 – Mahatma Gandhi begins the Salt March, a  march to the sea to protest the British monopoly on salt in India.
1933 – Great Depression: Franklin D. Roosevelt addresses the nation for the first time as President of the United States. This is also the first of his "fireside chats".
1938 – Anschluss: German troops occupy and absorb Austria.
1940 – Winter War: Finland signs the Moscow Peace Treaty with the Soviet Union, ceding almost all of Finnish Karelia.
  1940   – The most destructive train accident in Finnish history kills 39 and injures 69 people in Turenki, Janakkala.
1942 – The Battle of Java ends with the surrender of the American-British-Dutch-Australian Command to the Japanese Empire in Bandung, West Java, Dutch East Indies.
1947 – Cold War: The Truman Doctrine is proclaimed to help stem the spread of Communism.
1950 – The Llandow air disaster kills 80 people when the aircraft they are travelling in crashes near Sigingstone, Wales. At the time this was the world's deadliest air disaster.
1967 – Suharto takes power from Sukarno when the People's Consultative Assembly inaugurate him as Acting President of Indonesia.
1968 – Mauritius gains independence from the United Kingdom.
1971 – The 1971 Turkish military memorandum is sent to the Süleyman Demirel government of Turkey and the government resigns.
1989 – Sir Tim Berners-Lee submits his proposal to CERN for an information management system, which subsequently develops into the World Wide Web.
1992 – Mauritius becomes a republic while remaining a member of the Commonwealth of Nations.
1993 – Several bombs explode in Mumbai, India, killing about 300 people and injuring hundreds more.
  1993   – North Korea announces that it will withdraw from the Treaty on the Non-Proliferation of Nuclear Weapons and refuses to allow inspectors access to its nuclear sites.
1999 – Former Warsaw Pact members the Czech Republic, Hungary and Poland join NATO.
2003 – Zoran Đinđić, Prime Minister of Serbia, is assassinated in Belgrade.
  2003   – The World Health Organization officially release a global warning of outbreaks of Severe acute respiratory syndrome (SARS).
2004 – The President of South Korea, Roh Moo-hyun, is impeached by its National Assembly: the first such impeachment in the nation's history.
2009 – Financier Bernie Madoff pleads guilty to one of the largest frauds in Wall Street's history.
2011 – A reactor at the Fukushima Daiichi Nuclear Power Plant explodes and releases radioactivity into the atmosphere a day after the 2011 Tōhoku earthquake and tsunami.
2014 – A gas explosion in the New York City neighborhood of East Harlem kills eight and injures 70 others.
2018 – US-Bangla Airlines Flight 211 crashes at Tribhuvan International Airport in Katmandu, killing 51 and injuring 20.
2019 – In the House of Commons, the revised EU Withdrawal Bill was rejected by a margin of 149 votes.
2020 – The United States suspends travel from Europe due to the COVID-19 pandemic.

Births

Pre-1600
1270 – Charles, Count of Valois (d. 1325)
1515 – Caspar Othmayr, German Lutheran pastor and composer (d. 1553)

1601–1900
1607 – Paul Gerhardt, German poet and composer (d. 1676)
1613 – André Le Nôtre, French gardener and architect (d. 1700)
1626 – John Aubrey, English historian and philosopher (d. 1697)
1637 – Anne Hyde, Duchess of York and Albany (d. 1671)
1672 – Richard Steele, Irish-Welsh journalist and politician (d. 1729)
1685 – George Berkeley, Irish bishop and philosopher (d. 1753)
1710 – Thomas Arne, English composer (d. 1778)
1735 – François-Emmanuel Guignard, comte de Saint-Priest, French politician and diplomat (d. 1821)
1753 – Jean Denis, French politician, lawyer, jurist, journalist, and historian (d. 1827)
1766 – Claudius Buchanan, Scottish theologian (d. 1815)
1781 – Frederica of Baden, Queen consort to Gustav IV Adolf of Sweden (d. 1826)
1784 – William Buckland, English geologist and paleontologist; Dean of Westminster (d. 1856)
1795 – William Lyon Mackenzie, Scottish-Canadian journalist and politician, 1st Mayor of Toronto (d. 1861)
  1795   – George Tyler Wood, American military officer and politician (d. 1858)
1806 – Jane Pierce, American wife of Franklin Pierce, 15th First Lady of the United States (d. 1863)
1807 – James Abbott, Indian Army officer (d. 1896)
1815 – Louis-Jules Trochu, French military leader and politician (d. 1896)
1821 – John Abbott, Canadian lawyer and politician, 3rd Prime Minister of Canada (d. 1893)
  1821   – Medo Pucić, Croatian writer and politician (d. 1882)
1823 – Katsu Kaishū, Japanese statesman (d. 1899)
1824 – Gustav Kirchhoff, Russian-German physicist and academic (d. 1887)
1832 – Charles Boycott, English farmer and agent (d. 1897)
1834 – Hilary A. Herbert, Secretary of the Navy (d. 1919)
1835 – Simon Newcomb, Canadian-American astronomer and mathematician (d. 1909)
  1835   – Sigismondo Savona, Maltese educator and politician (d. 1908)
1837 – Alexandre Guilmant, French organist and composer (d. 1911)
1838 – William Henry Perkin, English chemist and academic (d. 1907)
1843 – Gabriel Tarde, French sociologist and criminologist (d. 1904)
1855 – Eduard Birnbaum, Polish-born German cantor (d. 1920)
1857 – William V. Ranous, American actor and director (d. 1915)
1858 – Adolph Ochs, American publisher (d. 1935)
1859 – Ernesto Cesàro, Italian mathematician (d. 1906)
1860 – Eric Stenbock, Estonian poet and author (d. 1895)
1863 – Gabriele D'Annunzio, Italian soldier, journalist, poet, and playwright (d. 1938)
  1863   – Vladimir Vernadsky, Russian and Ukrainian mineralogist and chemist (d. 1945)
1864 – W. H. R. Rivers, English anthropologist, neurologist, ethnologist, and psychiatrist (d. 1922)
  1864   – Alice Tegnér, Swedish organist, composer, and educator (d. 1943)
1869 – George Forbes, New Zealand politician, 22nd Prime Minister of New Zealand (d. 1947)
1874 – Edmund Eysler, Austrian composer (d. 1949)
1877 – Wilhelm Frick, German lawyer and politician, German Federal Minister of the Interior (d. 1946)
1878 – Gemma Galgani, Italian mystic and saint (d. 1903)
1880 – Henry Drysdale Dakin, English-American chemist and academic (d. 1952)
1881 – Väinö Tanner, Finnish politician of Social Democratic Party of Finland; the Prime Minister of Finland (d. 1966)
1882 – Carlos Blanco Galindo, Bolivian politician (d. 1943)
1883 – Sándor Jávorka, Hungarian botanist (d. 1961)
1888 – Walter Hermann Bucher, German-American geologist and paleontologist (d. 1965)
  1888   – Hans Knappertsbusch, German conductor (d. 1965)
1890 – Evert Taube, Swedish singer-songwriter and lute player (d. 1976)
1896 – Jesse Fuller, American singer-songwriter and musician (d. 1976)
1898 – Tian Han, Chinese playwright (d. 1968)
  1898   – Luitpold Steidle, German army officer and politician (d. 1984)
1899 – Ramón Muttis,  Argentine footballer (d. 1955)
1900 – Rinus van den Berge, Dutch athlete (d. 1972)
  1900   – Sylvi Kekkonen, Finnish writer and wife of President of Finland Urho Kekkonen (d. 1974)
  1900   – Gustavo Rojas Pinilla, 19th President of Colombia (d. 1975)

1901–present
1904 – Lyudmila Keldysh, Russian mathematician (d. 1976)
1905 – Takashi Shimura, Japanese actor (d. 1982)
1907 – Dorrit Hoffleit, American astronomer and academic (d. 2007)
1908 – Rita Angus, New Zealand painter (d. 1970)
  1908   – David Marshall, Singaporean lawyer and politician, 1st Chief Minister of Singapore (d. 1995)
1909 – Petras Cvirka, Lithuanian author (d. 1947)
1910 – Masayoshi Ōhira, Japanese politician, 68th Prime Minister of Japan (d. 1980)
  1910   – László Lékai, Archbishop of Esztergom and Cardinal (d. 1986)
1911 – Gustavo Díaz Ordaz, Mexican academic and politician, 49th President of Mexico (d. 1979)
1912 – Willie Hall, English international footballer (d. 1967)
  1912   – Irving Layton, Romanian-Canadian poet and academic (d. 2006)
1913 – Yashwantrao Chavan, Indian politician, 5th Deputy Prime Minister of India (d. 1984)
  1913   – Agathe von Trapp, Hungarian-American singer and author (d. 2010)
1915 – Alberto Burri, Italian painter and sculptor (d. 1995)
  1915   – Jiří Mucha, Czech journalist (d. 1991)
1917 – Leonard Chess, American record company executive, co-founder of Chess Records (d. 1969)
  1917   – Millard Kaufman, American author and screenwriter (d. 2009)
  1917   – Googie Withers, Indian-Australian actress (d. 2011)
1918 – Pádraig Faulkner, Irish Fianna Fáil politician (d. 2012)
  1918   – Elaine de Kooning, American painter and academic (d. 1989)
1921 – Gianni Agnelli, Italian businessman (d. 2001)
  1921   – Gordon MacRae, American actor and singer (d. 1986)
1922 – Jack Kerouac, American author and poet (d. 1969)
  1922   – Lane Kirkland, American sailor and union leader (d. 1999)
1923 – Hjalmar Andersen, Norwegian speed skater and cyclist (d. 2013)
  1923   – Norbert Brainin, Austrian violinist (d. 2005)
  1923   – Wally Schirra, American captain, pilot, and astronaut (d. 2007)
  1923   – Mae Young, American wrestler (d. 2014)
1925 – Leo Esaki, Japanese physicist and academic, Nobel Prize laureate
  1925   – Harry Harrison, American author and illustrator (d. 2012)
1926 – George Ariyoshi, American lawyer and politician, 3rd Governor of Hawaii
  1926   – Arthur A. Hartman, American career diplomat (d. 2015)
  1926   – John Clellon Holmes, American author and professor (d. 1988)
  1926   – David Nadien, American violinist (d. 2014)
1927 – Raúl Alfonsín, Argentinian lawyer and politician, 46th President of Argentina (d. 2009)
  1927   – Emmett Leith, professor of electrical engineering and co-inventor of three-dimensional holography (d. 2005)
  1927   – Sudharmono, 5th Vice President of Indonesia (d. 2006)
1928 – Edward Albee, American director and playwright (d. 2016)
1929 – Win Tin, Burmese journalist and politician, co-founded the National League for Democracy (d. 2014)
1930 – Antony Acland, British former diplomat and Provost of Eton College (d. 2021)
1931 – Józef Tischner, Polish priest and philosopher (d. 2000)
1932 – Bob Houbregs, Canadian basketball player (d. 2014)
  1932   – Andrew Young, American pastor and politician, 14th United States Ambassador to the United Nations
1933 – Myrna Fahey, American actress (d. 1973)
  1933   – Barbara Feldon, American actress
1934 – Francisco J. Ayala, Spanish-American evolutionary biologist and philosopher (d. 2023)
1936 – Virginia Hamilton, American children's books author (d. 2002)
  1936   – Michał Heller, Polish professor of philosophy
  1936   – Eddie Sutton, American basketball player and coach (d. 2020) 
1937 – Zoltán Horvath, Hungarian sabre fencer
  1937   – Zurab Sotkilava, Georgian operatic tenor (d. 2017)
1938 – Vladimir Msryan, Armenian actor (d. 2010)
  1938   – Johnny Rutherford, American race car driver and sportscaster
  1938   – Ken Spears, American writer (d. 2020)
  1938   – Juan Horacio Suárez, Argentine bishop
  1938   – Ron Tutt, American drummer (d. 2021)
1940 – Al Jarreau, American singer (d. 2017)
1941 – Josip Skoblar, former Croatian footballer
1942 – Jimmy Wynn, American baseball player (d. 2020)
1943 – Ratko Mladić, Serbian general
1944 – Erwin Mueller, former American basketball player (d. 2018)
1945 – Anne Summers, Australian feminist writer, editor, publisher and public servant 
1946 – Dean Cundey, American cinematographer and film director
  1946   – Liza Minnelli, American actress, singer and dancer
  1946   – Frank Welker, American voice actor and singer
1947 – Peter Harry Carstensen, German educator and politician
  1947   – Jan-Erik Enestam, Finland-Swedish politician
  1947   – David Rigert, Soviet Olympic weightlifter
  1947   – Mitt Romney, American businessman and politician, 70th Governor of Massachusetts
1948 – Virginia Bottomley, Scottish social worker and politician, Secretary of State for Culture, Media and Sport
  1948   – Kent Conrad, American politician
  1948   – James Taylor, American singer-songwriter and guitarist
1949 – Rob Cohen, American director, producer, and screenwriter
  1949   – David Mellor, British politician
1950 – Javier Clemente, Spanish footballer and manager
1952 – André Comte-Sponville, French philosopher
  1952   – Yasuhiko Okudera, former Japanese footballer
  1952   – John Mitchell, English footballer
1953 – Pavel Pinigin, former Soviet wrestler and Olympic champion
1954 – Anish Kapoor, Indian-English sculptor
1956 – Ove Aunli, former Norwegian cross-country skier
  1956   – Stanisław Bobak, Polish ski jumper (d. 2010)
  1956   – Steve Harris, English bass player and songwriter
  1956   – Lesley Manville, English actress
  1956   – Dale Murphy, American baseball player
  1956   – Pim Verbeek, Dutch football manager (d. 2019)
1957 – Patrick Battiston, French footballer and coach
  1957   – Marlon Jackson, American singer-songwriter and dancer
  1957   – Andrey Lopatov, Soviet basketball player
1958 – Phil Anderson, English-Australian cyclist
1959 – Milorad Dodik, Bosnian Serb politician and president of Republika Srpska
  1959   – Luenell, American comedian and actress
  1959   – Michael Walter, German luger (d. 2016)
1960 – Jason Beghe, American actor
  1960   – Courtney B. Vance, American actor and painter
1962 – Julia Campbell, American actress
  1962   – Andreas Köpke, German footballer
  1962   – Chris Sanders, American illustrator and voice actor
  1962   – Darryl Strawberry, American baseball player and minister
1963 – John Andretti, American race car driver (d. 2020)
  1963   – Candy Costie, American swimmer
  1963   – Joaquim Cruz, Brazilian runner and coach
  1963   – Reiner Gies, German boxer
  1963   – Ian Holloway, English footballer and manager
  1963   – Paul Way, English golfer
  1963   – Jake Weber, English actor
1964 – Dieter Eckstein, German footballer
  1964   – Umirzak Shukeyev, Kazakh chairman of Samruk-Kazyna
1965 – Steve Finley, American baseball player
  1965   – Ivari Padar, former Minister of Finance and Minister of Agriculture of the Estonian Social Democratic Party
1966 – David Daniels, American countertenor
  1966   – Grant Long, American basketball player and sportscaster
1967 – Julio Dely Valdés, Panamanian footballer and manager
1968 – Tammy Duckworth, Thai-American colonel, pilot, and politician
  1968   – Aaron Eckhart, American actor and producer
1969 – Graham Coxon, English singer-songwriter and guitarist
  1969   – Jake Tapper, American journalist and author
1970 – Karen Bradley, British politician
  1970   – Dave Eggers, American author and screenwriter
  1970   – Mathias Grönberg, Swedish golfer
  1970   – Rex Walters, American basketball player and coach
1971 – Isaiah Rider, American basketball player and rapper
  1971   – Dragutin Topić, Serbian high jumper
1972 – Doron Sheffer, Israeli basketball player
1974 – Charles Akonnor, Ghanaian footballer
  1974   – Walid Badir, Israeli footballer
1975 – Nicolae Grigore, Romanian footballer
  1975   – Edgaras Jankauskas, Lithuanian footballer
  1975   – Srđan Pecelj, Bosnian footballer
1976 – Deron Quint, American ice hockey defenseman
  1976   – Zhao Wei, Chinese actress, film director, producer and pop singer
1977 – Michelle Burgher, track and field athlete
  1977   – Ramiro Corrales, American soccer player
  1977   – Amdy Faye, Senegalese footballer
  1977   – Brent Johnson, American ice hockey player
1978 – Casey Mears, American race car driver
  1978   – Marco Ferreira, Portuguese footballer
  1978   – Arina Tanemura, Japanese author and illustrator
1979 – Rhys Coiro, American actor
  1979   – Pete Doherty, English musician, songwriter, actor, poet, writer, and artist
  1979   – Jamie Dwyer, Australian field hockey player and coach
  1979   – Gerard López, Spanish footballer
  1979   – Ben Sandford, New Zealand skeleton racer
  1979   – Tim Wieskötter, German sprint canoer
  1979   – Edwin Villafuerte, Ecuadorian footballer
1980 – Césinha, Brazilian footballer
  1980   – Becky Holliday, American pole vaulter
  1980   – Jens Mouris, Dutch cyclist
  1980   – Douglas Murray, Swedish ice hockey player
1981 – Kenta Kobayashi, Japanese wrestler and kick-boxer
  1981   – Katarina Srebotnik, Slovenian tennis player
  1981   – Holly Williams, American singer-songwriter and guitarist
1982 – Lili Bordán, Hungarian-American actress
  1982   – Samm Levine, American actor and comedian
  1982   – Ilya Nikulin, Russian ice hockey player
  1982   – Hisato Satō, Japanese footballer
  1982   – Yūto Satō, Japanese footballer
  1982   – Tobias Schweinsteiger, German footballer
1983 – Atif Aslam, Pakistani singer and actor
1984 – Shreya Ghoshal, Indian singer
  1984   – Jaimie Alexander, American actress
1985 – Marco Bonanomi, Italian racing driver
  1985   – Aleksandr Bukharov, Russian footballer
  1985   – Ed Clancy, English track and road cyclist
  1985   – Andriy Tovt, Ukrainian footballer
1986 – Martynas Andriuškevičius, Lithuanian basketball player
  1986   – Oleh Dopilka, Ukrainian footballer
  1986   – Danny Jones, English singer-songwriter, guitarist, and actor
  1986   – Ben Offereins, Australian runner
  1986   – František Rajtoral, Czech footballer (d. 2017)
1987 – Manuele Boaro, Italian cyclist
  1987   – Jessica Hardy, American swimmer
  1987   – Maxwell Holt, American volleyball player
  1987   – Teimour Radjabov, Azerbaijani chess player
  1987   – Chris Seitz, American soccer player
  1987   – Vadim Shipachyov, Russian ice hockey player
  1987   – Pablo Velázquez, Paraguayan footballer
1988 – Sebastian Brendel, German canoe racer
  1988   – Kostas Mitroglou, Greek footballer
  1988   – Cristian Chagas Tarouco, Brazilian footballer
1989 – Jordan Adéoti, French footballer
  1989   – Vytautas Černiauskas, Lithuanian footballer
  1989   – Tyler Clary, American swimmer
  1989   – Richard Eckersley, English footballer
  1989   – Chen Jianghua, Chinese basketball player
  1989   – Siim Luts, Estonian footballer
1990 – Alexander Kröckel, German skeleton racer
  1990   – Irakli Kvekveskiri, Georgian footballer
  1990   – Dawid Kubacki, Polish ski jumper
  1990   – Matias Myttynen, Finnish ice hockey player
  1990   – Ilija Nestorovski, Macedonian footballer
  1990   – Milena Raičević, Montenegrin handballer
  1990   – Mikko Sumusalo, Finnish footballer
1991 – Felix Kroos, German footballer
  1991   – Niclas Heimann, German footballer
  1991   – Leandro Fernandez, Argentine footballer
1992 – Daniele Baselli, Italian footballer
  1992   – Jordan Ferri, French footballer
  1992   – Ciara Mageean, Irish middle-distance runner
  1992   – Jiří Skalák, Czech footballer
1993 – Shehu Abdullahi, Nigerian footballer
  1993   – Amjad Attwan, Iraqi footballer
  1993   – Anton Shramchenko, Belarusian footballer
1994 – Katie Archibald, Scottish track cyclist
  1994   – Jerami Grant, American basketball player
  1994   – Christina Grimmie, American singer-songwriter (d. 2016)
1996 – Sehrou Guirassy, French footballer
  1996   – Karim Hafez, Egyptian footballer
  1996   – Robert Murić, Croatian footballer
  1996   – Cene Prevc, Slovenian ski jumper
1997 – Dean Henderson, English footballer
  1997   – Allan Saint-Maximin, French footballer
  1997   – Felipe Vizeu, Brazilian footballer
1998 – Mecole Hardman, American football player
  1998   – Daniel Samohin, Israeli figure skater
  1998   – Elizaveta Ukolova, Czech figure skater
2001 – Kim Min-kyu, South Korean singer and actor

Deaths

Pre-1600
 417 – Innocent I, pope of the Catholic Church
 604 – Gregory I, pope of the Catholic Church (b. 540)
1022 – Symeon the New Theologian (b. 949)
1160 – Al-Muqtafi, caliph of the Abbasid Caliphate (b. 1096)
1316 – Stefan Dragutin (b. c. 1244)
1539 – Thomas Boleyn, 1st Earl of Wiltshire, English diplomat and politician (b. 1477)

1601–1900
1699 – Peder Griffenfeld, Danish politician (b. 1635)
1898 – Zachris Topelius, Finnish-Swedish journalist, historian, and author (b. 1818)

1901–present
1916 – Marie von Ebner-Eschenbach, Austrian author (b. 1830)
1925 – Sun Yat-sen, Chinese physician and politician, 1st President of the Republic of China (b. 1866)
1929 – Asa Griggs Candler, American businessman and politician, 44th Mayor of Atlanta (b. 1851)
1935 – Mihajlo Pupin, Serbian-American physicist and chemist (b. 1858)
1942 – William Henry Bragg, English physicist, chemist, and mathematician, Nobel Prize laureate (b. 1862)
1943 – Gustav Vigeland, Norwegian sculptor (b. 1869)
1946 – Ferenc Szálasi, Hungarian soldier and politician, Head of State of Hungary (b. 1897)
1949 – Wilhelm Steinkopf, German chemist (b. 1879)
1954 – Marianne Weber, German sociologist and suffragist (b. 1870)
1955 – Charlie Parker, American saxophonist and composer (b. 1920)
  1955   – Theodor Plievier, German author best known for his anti-war novel (b. 1892)
1957 – Josephine Hull, American actress (b. 1877)
1971 – Eugene Lindsay Opie, American physician and pathologist (b. 1873)
1973 – Frankie Frisch, American baseball player and manager (b. 1898)
1974 – George D. Sax, American banker and businessman (b. 1904)
1985 – Eugene Ormandy, Hungarian-American violinist and conductor (b. 1899)
1989 – Maurice Evans, English-American actor (b. 1901)
1991 – Ragnar Granit, Finnish-Swedish neuroscientist and academic, Nobel Prize laureate (b. 1900)
  1991   – William Heinesen, Faroese author, poet, and author (b. 1900)
1992 – Lucy M. Lewis, American potter (b. 1890)
1998 – Beatrice Wood, American painter and potter (b. 1893)
1999 – Yehudi Menuhin, American-Swiss violinist and conductor (b. 1916)
  1999   – Bidu Sayão, Brazilian-American soprano (b. 1902)
2000 – Aleksandar Nikolić, Yugoslav basketball coach (b. 1924)
2001 – Morton Downey Jr., American singer-songwriter, actor, and talk show host (b. 1933)
  2001   – Robert Ludlum, American author (b. 1927)
  2001   – Victor Westhoff, Dutch botanist and academic (b. 1916)
2002 – Spyros Kyprianou, Cypriot lawyer and politician, 2nd President of Cyprus (b. 1932)
  2002   – Jean-Paul Riopelle, Canadian painter and sculptor (b. 1923)
2003 – Zoran Đinđić, Serbian philosopher and politician, 6th Prime Minister of Serbia (b. 1952)
  2003   – Howard Fast, American novelist and screenwriter (b. 1914)
  2003   – Lynne Thigpen, American actress and singer (b. 1948)
2004 – Milton Resnick, Russian-American painter (b. 1917)
2006 – Victor Sokolov, Russian-American priest and journalist (b. 1947)
2008 – Jorge Guinzburg, Argentinian journalist and producer (b. 1949)
  2008   – Lazare Ponticelli, Italian-French soldier and supercentenarian (b. 1897)
2010 – Miguel Delibes, Spanish journalist and author (b. 1920)
2011 – Nilla Pizzi, Italian singer (b. 1919)
2012 – Dick Harter, American basketball player and coach (b. 1930)
  2012   – Michael Hossack, American drummer (b. 1946)
  2012   – Friedhelm Konietzka, German-Swiss footballer and manager (b. 1938)
  2013   – Michael Grigsby, English director and producer (b. 1936)
  2013   – Ganesh Pyne, Indian painter and illustrator (b. 1937)
2014 – Věra Chytilová, Czech actress, director, and screenwriter (b. 1929)
  2014   – Paul C. Donnelly, American scientist and engineer (b. 1923)
  2014   – José Policarpo, Portuguese cardinal (b. 1936)
2015 – Willie Barrow, American minister and activist (b. 1924)
  2015   – Michael Graves, American architect and academic, designed the Portland Building and the Humana Building (b. 1934)
  2015   – Ada Jafri, Pakistani poet and author (b. 1924)
  2015   – Terry Pratchett, English journalist, author, and screenwriter (b. 1948)
2016 – Rafiq Azad, Bangladeshi poet and author (b. 1942)
  2016   – Felix Ibru, Nigerian architect and politician, Governor of Delta State (b. 1935)
  2016   – Lloyd Shapley, American mathematician and economist, Nobel Prize laureate (b. 1923)
2021 – Ronald DeFeo Jr., American criminal (b. 1951)

Holidays and observances
Arbor Day (China)
Arbor Day (Taiwan)
Aztec New Year
Christian feast day:
Alphege
Bernard of Carinola (or of Capua)
Gorgonius, Peter Cubicularius and Dorotheus of Nicomedia
Mura (McFeredach)
Fina
Maximilian of Tebessa
Paul Aurelian
Pope Gregory I (Eastern Orthodox Church, Eastern Catholic Church, and Anglican Communion)
Theophanes the Confessor
March 12 (Eastern Orthodox liturgics)
National Day (Mauritius)
World Day Against Cyber Censorship
Youth Day (Zambia)

References

External links

 BBC: On This Day
 
 Historical Events on March 12

Days of the year
March